Bramfield is a village and civil parish in the East Hertfordshire district, in the county of Hertfordshire, England. Nearby settlements include Hertford, Waterford and Stapleford. Bramfield has a church dedicated to St Andrew.

See also
Sally Rainbow

References

External links 

 British History Online
 http://www.hertfordshire-genealogy.co.uk/links/bramfield.htm
 Listed buildings in Bramfield

East Hertfordshire District
Civil parishes in Hertfordshire
Villages in Hertfordshire